The Nyamiha stampede took place at Nyamiha metro station in Minsk, Belarus. On May 30, 1999, a sudden thunderstorm caused a number of young people to race for shelter during an open-air concert nearby. The stampede was funneled into the blocked underpass of the metro station and many people (mostly young women) were killed in the ensuing crush when they started slipping on the wet pavement, falling, and trampling each other.

The official death toll was 53.

Belarus had a three-day mourning period after the event.

References

Human stampedes in 1999
1990s in Minsk
1999 in Belarus
Man-made disasters in Belarus
Minsk Metro
Human stampedes in Europe